Stand Up For Justice: The Ralph Lazo Story (2004) is an educational narrative short film, co-produced by Nikkei for Civil Rights and Redress (NCRR) and Visual Communications (VC).

Background 
When 120,000 Japanese Americans were forcibly evacuated from the West Coast of the United States during World War II, Ralph Lazo, a 16-year-old of Mexican American and Irish American descent  from Downtown Los Angeles followed his Japanese American friends, neighbors and classmates in to the Manzanar Japanese American internment camp.  He remained in the U.S. internment camp until 1944, when he was drafted in to the army, and served in the Pacific theater. Not many beyond the Japanese American community knew of his story, inspiring Nikkei for Civil Rights and Redress (NCRR) to partner with Visual Communications to create an educational film to teach his cross-cultural story in the classroom.  Funded by grants from the California Civil Liberties Public Education Program, the half-hour drama was shot at the Manzanar National Historic Site, and in Los Angeles, and completed in 2004.

Plot 
In 1941, Ralph Lazo is a 16-year-old student at Belmont High School, an ethnically mixed school in downtown Los Angeles. When Pearl Harbor is bombed, Ralph's Japanese American friend, Jimmy Matsuoka, and his family are forced to sell their belongings and evacuate to a remote concentration camp. Ralph surprises his friends at the train station as they are about to depart for Manzanar, a relocation center in central California. He joins them for the 5-hour train ride, the three-year stay, and a lifelong friendship.

Cast 
 Alexis Cruz as Ralph Lazo
 Chad Sakamoto as Jimmy
 Brittany Ishibashi as Ruby
 Marcus Toji as Art
 Greg Hashimoto as Harry
 Emily Kuroda as Mrs. Matsuoka
 Tim Toyama as Mr. Matsuoka
 Ciro Suarez as Ralph's Father
 Sarah Rincon as Ralph's Sister
 Ron Martinez as Senior Ralph
 Takayo Fischer as Senior Ruby

References

External links
 
 Stand Up For Justice page on NCRR site

American biographical films
Films about the internment of Japanese Americans
Films about Japanese Americans
American drama short films
Films set in the 1940s
2000s English-language films
2000s American films